Canon Francis Bernard Ross Browne (28 July 1899 – 11 March 1970) was an English cricketer/bowler, schoolteacher and clergyman.

Cricket career
Browne attended Eastbourne College, where he led the bowling in the First XI. He underwent military training at the Royal Military Academy, Woolwich, towards the end of World War I, and went up to Emmanuel College, Cambridge, after the war.

Despite a bowling action which Wisden described as "a weird delivery that defies description" in which "he appeared to cross his legs and deliver the ball off the wrong foot", and which earned him the nickname "Tishy" after a racehorse with a strange gait, he was a successful bowler in first-class cricket from 1919 to 1932. He played for Cambridge University in 1921 and 1922, taking 68 wickets at an average of 14.44, with a best performance of 3 for 34 and 6 for 27 in a victory over Warwickshire in 1922.

He played as an amateur for Sussex from 1919 to 1932, usually in July and August during the school holidays. His best figures for Sussex were 3 for 17 and 7 for 62 in a narrow loss to Yorkshire in 1925. In all first-class cricket his best innings figures were 8 for 39 for H. D. G. Leveson-Gower's XI against Minor Counties in 1924.

He usually batted at number 11 and scored more than 13 runs in an innings only twice in his career: in the match against Lancashire in 1928 he made 14 not out and 26 not out.

Later career
When he left Cambridge, Browne became a schoolmaster at St Andrew's prep school in Eastbourne, where he became joint headmaster. He was later rural dean at Firle and Beddingham in Sussex.  

Whilst Rural Dean at Firle, he baptised Camilla, Duchess of Cornwall in November 1947.

References

External links
 Francis Browne at Cricinfo
 Francis Browne at CricketArchive

1899 births
1970 deaths
Military personnel from Sussex
British military personnel of World War I
English cricketers
Sussex cricketers
People educated at Eastbourne College
Alumni of Emmanuel College, Cambridge
Cambridge University cricketers
Free Foresters cricketers
Sportspeople from Eastbourne
Church of England deans
Schoolteachers from Sussex
H. D. G. Leveson Gower's XI cricketers
Graduates of the Royal Military Academy, Woolwich